The 2014 Antrim Senior Hurling Championship is the 114th staging of the Antrim Senior Hurling Championship since its establishment by the Antrim County Board in 1901. The championship began on 3 August 2013.

Loughgiel Shamrocks were the reigning champions, however, they were defeated in the quarter-final stage. Ruairí Óg, Cushendall won the title following a 1-15 to 1-5 defeat of St Gall's in the final at Páirc Mac Uílín.

Commonly the finals take place at Antrim's county stadium, Casement Park, however due to the grounds ongoing developments the 2014 final was held at Páirc Mac Uílín in Ballycastle.

Fixtures/results

Round 1

Quarter-finals

Semi-finals

Final

External links
 2014 Antrim Senior Hurling Championship fixtures and results

References

Antrim Senior Hurling Championship
Antrim Senior Hurling Championship